Hune is a village in North Jutland, Denmark. It is located in Jammerbugt Municipality.

Blokhus Sculpture Park
Blokhus Sculpture Park (Danish: Blokhus Skulpturpark) is located in Hune. It is a sculpture park with sculptures in sand, concrete and wood. The main attraction of the park is the large sand sculptures, created by professionals and costing approximately 80,000 DKK (12,998.56 USD) a piece to create. Although the concrete and wood sculptures cost similarly much, they generally remain permanently in the park, while the sand sculptures only last a short time.

References

Cities and towns in the North Jutland Region
Jammerbugt Municipality
Villages in Denmark